Jon Irazabal Iraurgui (born 28 November 1996) is a Spanish professional footballer who plays as either a central defender or a left back for Sabah.

Club career
Born in Bilbao, Biscay, Basque Country, Irazabal finished his formation at Danok Bat CF. In 2015, he joined CD Sondika in the regional leagues, and made his senior debut during the campaign.

In July 2016, Irazabal signed for SD Eibar and was assigned to the farm team in Tercera División. On 6 July 2018, he was loaned to Segunda División B side CD Mirandés for one year.

Irazabal contributed with only five appearances during the whole 2018–19 season, as his side achieved promotion to Segunda División; his contract was automatically extended for a further year. On 21 January 2020, he terminated his contract with the club, and signed for SD Leioa in the third division the following day.

On 15 July 2020, Irazabal left Leioa, and signed for fellow league team SD Amorebieta on 1 September. He was a regular starter for the Azules during the campaign, as his side achieved a first-ever promotion to the second division.

Irazabal made his professional debut on 14 August 2021, starting in a 0–2 away loss against Girona FC.

References

External links

1996 births
Living people
Footballers from Bilbao
Spanish footballers
Association football defenders
Segunda División players
Segunda División B players
Tercera División players
Divisiones Regionales de Fútbol players
CD Vitoria footballers
CD Mirandés footballers
SD Leioa players
SD Amorebieta footballers
Danok Bat CF players